Lupe Inclán (1895–1956) was a Mexican actress, which became very popular in Mexican Carpa Theatrical plays. She was also known for movies, mainly acting in supporting comic roles. She was known as one of the most prominent Mexican actresses interpreting village women in the 20th century.

Biography

Early life 
Lupe Inclán was born in 1895, in the family of María de Jesús Delgado and Miguel Inclán García, which both ran a travelling theater company. Moreover, her brother Miguel Inclán also became a very renowned Mexican actor, known for his roles portraying villains.

In 1920, Lupe had two twin daughters, both of which followed her mother's path and became theatrical actresses. Gloria Alicia, one of the daughters, later became the mother of Rafael Inclán, another prominent Mexican actor, who won the Ariel Award.

Theatrical Debut 
Lupe Inclán officially debuted on 31 December 1919 with the play "19–20". Unfortunately, the play was controversial, since it depicted acts of the former president and the audience reacted poorly, resulting in the closure of the forum. After the failure of her debut, Inclán started working in companies and troupes of Carmen Martínez, the Tarazona brothers and de Julio Taboada, all well-known actors.

Film Debut 
She made her movie debut in the early 1940s. Lupe mainly acted in supporting roles alongside comedians and great stars of the Golden Age of Mexican cinema. Her more influential and major roles include:

 María Candelaria (1944), by Emilio "Indio" Fernández,
 Capullito de alhelí (1945)
 Allá en el Rancho Grande (1949)
 El niño perdido (1947)
 Soy charro de levita (1949)
 La marca del zorrillo (1950)
 El revoltoso (1951)

Awards

Ariel Awards

References 

1895 births
1956 deaths